Thierno Niang (born 18 January 1992) is a Senegalese football player who plays for São João Ver.

Club career
He made his professional debut in the Segunda Liga for Leixões on 12 September 2015 in a game against Vitória Guimarães B.

References

External links
 

1992 births
Sportspeople from Saint-Louis, Senegal
Living people
Senegalese footballers
AS Pikine players
Leixões S.C. players
F.C. Pedras Rubras players
S.C. Freamunde players
R.D. Águeda players
C.D. Trofense players
Gondomar S.C. players
SC São João de Ver players
Campeonato de Portugal (league) players
Liga Portugal 2 players
Senegalese expatriate footballers
Expatriate footballers in Portugal
Senegalese expatriate sportspeople in Portugal
Association football forwards